The 2015 CONCACAF Gold Cup qualification (CFU–UNCAF play-off) was a home-and-away two-legged qualification play-off that took place on the 25th and 29th of March 2015 to determine the final team that qualified for the 2015 CONCACAF Gold Cup. In March 2014, CONCACAF Vice-President Horace Burrell announced that the fifth-placed teams from the 2014 Caribbean Cup and 2014 Copa Centroamericana would meet in the play-off.

Overview
The Caribbean Football Union (CFU) representative, French Guiana, met the Central American Football Union (UNCAF) representative, Honduras, in the play-off.

The CONCACAF-published Free Kick magazine confirmed that there would be two legs to the competition.

The games took place on 25 and 29 March 2015 during the only international window on the FIFA International Match Calendar that occurred after the completion of the 2014 Caribbean Cup and before the 2015 CONCACAF Gold Cup is scheduled to begin. The games were originally scheduled to take place in January 2015.

Qualified teams

Summary

Matches

Honduras won 4–3 on aggregate and qualified for the 2015 CONCACAF Gold Cup.

Goalscorers

References

External links
CONCACAF Gold Cup , CONCACAF.com

qualification
2015
Honduras national football team matches
French Guiana national football team matches
2014–15 in Honduran football
2014–15 in French Guianan football
March 2015 sports events in North America